Charles Robert Jackson (born March 3, 1936) is a former American football defensive back who played one season with the Chicago Cardinals of the National Football League (NFL). He was drafted by the Chicago Cardinals in the 13th round of the 1958 NFL Draft. He played college football at Southern Methodist University and attended Paris High School in Paris, Texas. Jackson was also a member of the Dallas Texans of the American Football League.

References

External links
Just Sports Stats
College stats

Living people
1936 births
Players of American football from Texas
American football defensive backs
SMU Mustangs football players
Chicago Cardinals players
Dallas Texans (AFL) players
People from Paris, Texas